Royal Prussian Jagdstaffel 41, commonly abbreviated to Jasta 41, was a "hunting group" (i.e., fighter squadron) of the Luftstreitkräfte, the air arm of the Imperial German Army during World War I. The unit would score 73 aerial victories during the war, including ten observation balloons downed. The squadron's victories came at the expense of ten killed in action, two killed in flying accidents, three wounded in action, and one taken prisoner of war.

History
Jasta 41 was founded at Flieger-Abteilung (Flier Detachment) 4, Posen on 18 June 1917. It scored its first aerial victory on 3 September 1917.

Commanding officers (Staffelführer)
 Maxmilian Zeigler gen Stege: until 3 September 1917
 Georg Schlenker: 3 September 1917
 Fritz Höhn: 30 September 1918
 Helmut Brünig: 4 October 1918

Duty stations
 Posen
 Habsheim: 5 August 1917

Notable personnel
 Josef Schwendemann
 Hans Weiss
 Georg Schlenker
 Walter Kypke

Operations
Jasta 41 supported Armee-Abteilung B from 5 August 1917 onwards.

References

Bibliography
 

41
Military units and formations established in 1917
1917 establishments in Germany
Military units and formations disestablished in 1918